Camogli is a fishing village and tourist resort located on the west side of the peninsula of Portofino, on the Golfo Paradiso in the Riviera di Levante, in the Metropolitan City of Genoa, Liguria, northern Italy.  its population was of 5,332. Camogli is one of the largest areas of the Parco Naturale Regionale di Portofino, and a part of the Portofino Marine Protected Area.

History

The name of the town is of ancient, though of disputed origin.

One story suggests it comes from the shortened Casa de Moglie. When the ship captains sailed, they put their wives (mogli) in a sort of home for all of them (casa), and the town was well known for this.  

In the late Middle Ages, Camogli was a considerable seaport. In its heyday, its fleet consisted of hundreds of Tall Ships, and it was called the "city of a thousand white sails". In 1798 the city hosted a large contingent of Napoleon's fleet, which was then beaten in the Egyptian waters of the Nile by Admiral Nelson. The prestigious naval college "Cristoforo Colombo" was founded in Camogli in 1874, named after the Genoese navigator Christopher Columbus.

In 1880, the former fishing village had, in a population of 12,000, 500 registered as ship captains. Camogli now relies mainly on tourism and is known for its colorful houses that line the beach. The house colors once helped the fishermen of Camogli find the way back to their port.

The local swimming club water polo RN Camogli has won several Italian championships and is known nationwide.

In February 2021, the cliff collapsed below the cemetery that is sited 70m above the water, and coffins fell into the sea. 11 caskets were recovered from the water, and more from the landslide.

Trivia 
Camogli Hospital on the South Atlantic island of Tristan da Cunha is named after the town, to  commemorate the fact that it was the home of Repetto and Gaetano Lavarello, who settled on the island in 1892.

People
 Francesco Capurro, 17th-century painter
 Ruggero Chiesa (1933–1993), classical guitarist and editor

Twin towns
 Tuningen, Germany, since 1998
 Carloforte, Italy, since 2004

References

Cities and towns in Liguria
Coastal towns in Liguria
Fishing communities in Italy
Italian Riviera